Summer Serenade (also released as In Copenhagen) is an album by saxophonist/composer Benny Carter recorded in 1980 in Denmark and released by the Storyville label in 1982.

Reception

AllMusic reviewer Scott Yanow stated "Benny Carter has recorded so many excellent swing sessions throughout his lengthy career that it is very difficult to pick out the best ones; there's too much competition".

Track listing
All compositions by Benny Carter except where noted
 "Indiana" (James F. Hanley, Ballard MacDonald) – 5:08
 "Almost Like Being in Love" (Frederick Loewe, Alan Jay Lerner) – 7:22
 "Summer Serenade" – 4:15
 "All That Jazz" (Carter, Al Stillman) – 5:03
 "Blue Star" – 8:06
 "When Lights Are Low" – 6:01
 "Taking a Chance on Love"  (Vernon Duke) – 8:20

Personnel 
Benny Carter – alto saxophone
Kenny Drew – piano
Jesper Lundgaard – bass
Ed Thigpen – drums

References 

1982 albums
Benny Carter albums
Storyville Records albums